Piesslinger is a traditional aluminium processing company in Molln, Austria founded in 1553. 

The basic facts: 
Piesslinger is a family business now run by the 11th generation.
It processes aluminum surfaces (powder coating and anodizing) of doors and windows.
Aluminum is processed into decorative parts, such as Nespresso capsules, speakers and coffee machines.

See also 
List of oldest companies

References 

Article contains translated text from Piesslinger on the German Wikipedia retrieved on 25 February 2017.

External links 
Homepage

Metal companies of Austria
Companies established in the 16th century
16th-century establishments in the Holy Roman Empire
Establishments in the Archduchy of Austria